Hello, World! is the first extended play by South Korean rock band Xdinary Heroes. It was released by Studio J and JYP Entertainment on July 20, 2022. The extended play consists six tracks, including the lead single "Test Me".

Background and release 
In late June 2022, they released a new video entitled "How to enjoy ♭form with Xdinary Heroes". The next day, Xdinary Heroes announced their first-ever comeback with Hello, World! an extended play to be released in July 20. An instrumental sampler and highlight film were released on June 30 and July 14, respectively. In the next days, two music video teasers were unveiled revealing the storyline of the music video. The extended play alongside the music video for "Test Me" was released on July 20.

Composition
Hello, World! consists of five tracks written and composed by the band. The lead single "Test Me" is synth pop-rock song with lyrics about "defiance and having the courage to say “no" to a conformist society."

Promotion 
On July 20, 2022, Xdinary Heroes held a comeback showcase for the new album where they performed all tracks from the Hello, World! and also their previous single "Happy Death Day". Moreover, the band also appeared in several music shows such as SBS's Inkigayo, MBC's Show! Music Core, and KBS's Music Bank. Furthermore, live clips of the band performing the songs from the album were also released. On August 9, the band released a music video for the B-side "Strawberry Cake."

Track listing

Charts

Weekly charts

Monthly charts

Sales

Release history

References 

2022 EPs
JYP Entertainment EPs
Korean-language EPs